Totally Committed is an album by American comedian Jeff Foxworthy. It was released by Warner Bros. Records on May 19, 1998. The album peaked at number 50 on the Billboard 200 chart and has been certified Gold by the RIAA.

Track listing
All tracks written by Jeff Foxworthy and Ritch Shydner except where noted.
"Introduction" – 0:31
"You Can't Give Rednecks Money" – 1:48
"Sophisticated People vs. Rednecks" – 6:18
"Faded Genes" – 1:26
"I Still Don't Know…" – 10:25
"The Rules of Marriage" – 10:38
"Protect Our Stuff" – 5:24
"Every Single Hair on Her Body" – 5:53
"I Don't Want to Be Single Again" – 8:30
"Encore" – 3:36
"Totally Committed" (Foxworthy, James Hollihan, Jr.) – 3:20
featuring Tim Rushlow

Charts

Weekly charts

Year-end charts

References

1998 albums
Jeff Foxworthy albums
Warner Records live albums
1990s comedy albums
Live comedy albums
Spoken word albums by American artists